The Coalition for Open Government was a political pressure group formed in the late 1970s to promote open government in New Zealand. The Coalition disbanded in the-mid 1980s but re-formed in April 2007, in response to Government plans to rewrite the election finance laws.

History
The group was formed in September 1979 in opposition to the then Prime Minister Robert Muldoon's Think Big programme. It had concerns around the speed, secrecy and lack of public consultation of related legislation (particularly the National Development Act 1979). The opposition to the act and the group itself was led by Sir Guy Powles, the former Chief Ombudsman of New Zealand.

It sought to allow greater access to government-held information. The pressure it exerted was important in the adoption of the Official Information Act 1982.

Patrons
The group's patrons are Lloyd Geering, Patricia Grace, Anton Oliver and Paul Harris.

See also
 Electoral Finance Bill (New Zealand)

Notes

References

1979 establishments in New Zealand
Political groupings in New Zealand